"Lovey-Dovey" is a song by South Korean girl group T-ara from their fourth extended play Black Eyes (2011) repackage, Funky Town (2012). It was released as the lead single on January 3, 2012. A thirty-second teaser of "Lovey-Dovey" was unveiled at the end of their "Cry Cry" music video, with a full one-minute teaser released on November 30, 2011.

Written and produced by Shinsadong Tiger and Choi Kyu-sung, "Lovey-Dovey" is an electropop song with strong beats, and the instrumental features the use of cowbells and scratching. The song is described as being influenced by the "trendy club music popular in Europe and the United States". The lyrics are about the protagonist feeling lonely without, as well as seeking for, their love interest.

"Lovey-Dovey" reached number one in South Korea as well as number one on the Billboard Korea K-Pop Hot 100 chart. Five music videos have been produced for the song, but only three of the five have been released to date. The first version is a continuation of their earlier "Cry Cry" drama music video, the second features a zombie concept, and the third follows the group traveling and promoting around Tokyo, Japan. The song won a total of thirteen number one awards on various South Korean music shows: four on Music Bank, four on Music on Top, three on Inkigayo, and two on M! Countdown.

Background
"Lovey-Dovey" was written and produced by Shinsadong Tiger and Choi Kyu-song. It was revealed on an episode of MBC's K-pop Star Captivating the World that Junhyung of Beast helped suggest song titles and other ideas to Shinsadong Tiger while he was working on the song. In early October 2011, it was reported that T-ara would be promoting "Lovey-Dovey" for their comeback album in November. It was originally decided that the group was to promote both "Cry Cry" and "Lovey-Dovey" at the same time, however, because the two songs had completely different concepts, they made a last minute final decision to promote "Lovey-Dovey" after promotions for "Cry Cry" were over.

Critical reception
Katherine St. Asaph of Popdust included "Lovey-Dovey" on their 'Weekend Playlist' at number seven, describing the song as "... the exact midpoint between today's dance and latter-day disco, with an infectious curtsy of a chorus and vocal burbles."

Chart performance
In Korea, the song debuted at number one on the Gaon Chart, making it their third consecutive number one—including their collaboration with labelmate Davichi. "Lovey-Dovey" made its debut on the Billboard Korea K-Pop Hot 100 at number 20 on the issue dated January 14, 2012, and then climbed to the top of the chart the following week; making it their second consecutive number one. The song spent three weeks at number one on the chart and seven weeks in the top ten.

At the end of 2012, song was downloaded more than 3,700,000 times in South Korea.

Music videos
T-ara's management agency Core Contents Media announced that a total of three music video directors will be involved in the production of five music videos for "Lovey-Dovey", including "drama"; "dance"; and "club" versions. However, only the "drama" version has been released; with the additional "zombie" and "Tokyo" versions, out of the five. Another version was produced for the Japanese remake of "Lovey-Dovey".

In the "zombie" version, everyone was having a party when a young woman enters the bathroom and puts on her lipstick and then a zombie enters the place and kills her. As more club members get murdered with some women screaming, a security guard tries to keep the zombies out by shutting the hinged bars. But they later break in about to kill T-ara who's in the middle of their performance after the bridge. The scene then transitions into the afterlife where the murdered ones dance with T-ara during the rest. It ends with the two survivors who meet in the mess and he takes her home.

Track listing

Charts

Weekly charts

Year-end charts

Oricon

Accolades

Awards and nominations

Music programs trophies

Lists

Release history

See also
 List of best-selling singles in South Korea
 List of number-one hits of 2012 (South Korea)
 List of Hot 100 number-one singles of 2012 (Korea)

References

External links

2012 singles
T-ara songs
Korean-language songs
Japanese-language songs
Songs written by Shinsadong Tiger
2012 songs
Gaon Digital Chart number-one singles
Billboard Korea K-Pop number-one singles